Hon. John Estmond Strickland, GBS, JP, the former Chairman of the Hongkong and Shanghai Banking Corporation Ltd. (1996–1998) with responsibility for HSBC's operations in Asia Pacific, was a Hong Kong-based businessman and philanthropist. He joined HSBC in Hong Kong in 1970, and was in charge of IT development and strategy, globally, and helped develop HSBC's core banking systems.

He has honorary fellowships with the University of Hong Kong, the Hong Kong Computer Society, the Hong Kong Institute of Bankers and the Hong Kong Management Association as well as honorary doctorates from City University of Hong Kong and Hong Kong Polytechnic University.

Education
He graduated from Jesus College, Cambridge with a degree of Master of Arts in Physics.

Career
 Chairman of the Board, Hong Kong Internet Registration Corporation
 Member of the Airport Authority Board and Antiquities Advisory Board
 Independent Non-executive Director of Hong Kong Exchanges and Clearing Limited since March 31, 2004
 President of the Outward Bound Trust of Hong Kong.
 HSBC Group's IT (1971 to 1995)
 Chairman of Hong Kong Cyberport Management Co. Ltd.
 Director of Airport Authority Hong Kong since June 1999
 Independent Non-executive Director of Integrated Distribution Services Group Ltd., since 21 October 2004.
 Director of Esquel Holdings Inc.
 Director, Yoma Strategic Investments Ltd.

Affiliations
Strickland is the President of the Trust Officers of The Outward Bound Hong Kong, and member or boardmember of such organizations as the Community Chest, the Boys' and Girls' Clubs Association of Hong Kong, the Hong Kong Youth Hostel Association, the Salvation Army Advisory Board, the Antiquities Advisory Board, Hong Kong Adventure Corps, the Independent Schools Foundation, the China Exploration and Research Society and the Asia Society.

Honorary fellowships/doctorates
 Honorary Fellowship, University of Hong Kong
 Honorary Fellowship, Hong Kong Computer Society
 Honorary Fellowship, Hong Kong Institute of Bankers
 Honorary Fellowship, Hong Kong Management Association
 Honorary Doctorate, City University of Hong Kong
 Honorary Doctorate, Hong Kong Polytechnic University

External links
PR Newswire report

References

Year of birth missing (living people)
British bankers
Hong Kong civil servants
Hong Kong philanthropists
HSBC people
Living people
Alumni of Jesus College, Cambridge
Place of birth missing (living people)
Hong Kong chief executives
Hong Kong bankers
Recipients of the Gold Bauhinia Star